Hugh French Thomason (February 22, 1826 – July 30, 1893) was an American politician who served as Arkansas state representative from Crawford County from 1887 to 1889 and as Arkansas state senator from 1881 to 1885. He previously served in the Provisional Congress of the Confederate States representing Arkansas from 1861 to 1862.

Early life
Thomason was born in Smith County, Tennessee, on February 22, 1826. His father moved to Washington County, Arkansas, when he was three years old. He was educated principally at Cane Hill, Arkansas, and studied law at Fayetteville, in the office of W. D. Reagan. He afterwards removed to Van Buren and engaged in the practice of law.

Political career
Thomason first came into prominence as a politician as presidential elector when he canvassed the state against the celebrated Thomas C. Hindman. He was prosecuting attorney of the 4th Judicial Circuit from 1853 to 1854 and a member of the secession convention in 1861. In 1868 he was elected to the lower house of the legislature.

He was a candidate for congress in 1872 and was defeated by Judge W. W. Wilshire. He was one of the delegates to the congress of the Confederate States at Montgomery, Alabama, with Robert W. Johnson, Albert Rust, William W. Watkins, and Augustus H. Garland from May 18, 1861, to February 17, 1862. He represented Crawford County in the constitutional convention in 1874. he was elected State Senator in 1881 and attended two sessions of the state senate. He was returned to the lower house in 1886.

Later life
Thomason was elected judge of the 15th judicial circuit in September 1890, which position he held at the time of his death. He was buried at Fairview Cemetery (Van Buren, Arkansas), on July 31, 1893, with Masonic honors.

See also
 List of people from Tennessee

Notes

References

External links
 
 Hugh French Thomason at The Political Graveyard

1826 births
1893 deaths
19th-century American politicians
American Freemasons
American lawyers admitted to the practice of law by reading law
Arkansas circuit court judges
Arkansas lawyers
Democratic Party Arkansas state senators
Burials in Arkansas
Deputies and delegates to the Provisional Congress of the Confederate States
Democratic Party members of the Arkansas House of Representatives
People from Smith County, Tennessee
People of Arkansas in the American Civil War
Recipients of American presidential pardons
19th-century American judges
19th-century American lawyers